Michael Carter Tate AO (born 6 July 1945) is a legal academic and former Australian Labor Party politician who later became an ambassador and then a Catholic priest.

Early life and education
Tate was born in Sydney in 1945.  He was educated at St Virgil's College in Hobart, and then studied law at the University of Tasmania, where he resided at St. John Fisher College and graduated with a Bachelor of Laws with First Class Honours in 1968. He attributed his achievement to the long hours he spent in libraries, rather than in sporting or social activities, while recovering from a serious road accident in 1963, which hospitalised him in neck-to-knee plaster for five months and required further operations for the next eight years. He later gained a Master of Arts in Theology from the University of Oxford in 1971. He worked as a lecturer in Law at the University of Tasmania Faculty of Law from 1972 to 1978, serving as Dean of the Faculty from 1977 to 1978.

He served as Legal Adviser to the Tasmanian Parliamentary Delegation to the Constitutional Conventions from 1973 to 1977, and was a member of the Catholic Commission for Justice and Peace from 1972 to 1978.

Political career
He was elected to the Senate representing Tasmania, at the 1977 election, his term commencing on 1 July 1978. He was re-elected in 1983, 1987 and 1993. He was President of the Parliamentary Christian Fellowship 1985 to 1988. In 1986 he chaired two Senate enquiries into the conduct of his former Labor colleague and now High Court justice Lionel Murphy.  He concluded that on the civil law standard of proof, the balance of probabilities, Murphy had a case to answer on the charge of perverting the course of justice, but not if the criminal standard, beyond reasonable doubt, was applied.  He served as Minister for Justice from 1987 to 1993 in the Hawke and Keating governments, in addition to other portfolios. He resigned from the Senate on 5 July 1993.

After leaving politics he was appointed Australian Ambassador to the Netherlands and the Holy See, before retiring to enter the priesthood.

In 1992 and 1996, respectively, Tate was awarded honorary doctorates from the University of Tasmania and Charles Sturt University; and, in the Australia Day Honours of 1996, he was appointed an Officer of the Order of Australia (AO). All of these awards honoured the role Tate played as Federal Minister for Justice.

Later career
On 19 May 2000 he was ordained by the Archbishop of Hobart, the Most Rev. Adrian Leo Doyle in St Mary's Cathedral, Hobart. Guests included former Governor-General Bill Hayden, former Prime Minister, Gough Whitlam, and former Attorneys-General Lionel Bowen and Michael Duffy. Congratulatory messages were received from Pope John Paul II and former Prime Ministers Bob Hawke and Paul Keating. That night, he told the ABC's 7.30 Report that during his last audience with the Pope as Ambassador to the Holy See, John Paul II asked him what his next posting would be. John Paul was somewhat surprised when Tate told him he would be studying for the priesthood. Tate worked as parish priest of the Roman Catholic Parishes of Bridgewater, Sandy Bay, Huon Valley, and currently serves as parish priest of South Hobart.  He is Vicar General of the Archdiocese of Hobart.

In April 2008, Tate participated in the Future of Australian Governance Committee at the Australia 2020 Summit as a general summit delegate.

On 18 November 2010, Tate was appointed as Tasmania's first Parliamentary Standards Commissioner. The role was established under the Integrity Commission Act 2009. The Commissioner is independent of the Integrity Commission and provides advice to Members of Parliament and the Integrity Commission about conduct, propriety and ethics and the interpretation of any relevant codes of conduct and guidelines relating to the conduct of Members of Parliament.

On top of his ministry, Tate has continued his research in law, particularly in the area of international humanitarian law, and currently works in a part-time capacity as Honorary Research Professor at the University of Tasmania's Faculty of Law. He was a member of Australian Red Cross's International Humanitarian Law Committee.

References

External links
 7.30 Report transcript
 Parliamentary biography

1945 births
Living people
Ambassadors of Australia to the Holy See
Ambassadors of Australia to the Netherlands
Australian Labor Party members of the Parliament of Australia
Australian Roman Catholic priests
Members of the Australian Senate
Members of the Australian Senate for Tasmania
Officers of the Order of Australia
Alumni of the University of Oxford
University of Tasmania alumni
Academic staff of the University of Tasmania
People educated at St Virgil's College
20th-century Australian politicians